Ruben Bemelmans and Daniel Masur were the defending champions but only Masur chose to defend his title, partnering Marco Bortolotti. They withdrew before their first round match.

Zizou Bergs and David Pel won the title after defeating Constantin Frantzen and Hendrik Jebens 6–2, 7–6(8–6) in the final.

Seeds

Draw

References

External links
 Main draw

Challenger Città di Lugano - Doubles